La Glace is a hamlet in northern Alberta, Canada within the County of Grande Prairie No. 1.

The hamlet is located in Census Division No. 19 and in the federal riding of Grande Prairie—Mackenzie.

Demographics 

See also 
List of communities in Alberta
List of designated places in Alberta
List of hamlets in Alberta

References 

County of Grande Prairie No. 1
Hamlets in Alberta
Designated places in Alberta